Scott Everts Brayton (February 20, 1959 – May 17, 1996) was an American race car driver on the American open-wheel circuit. He competed in 14 Indianapolis 500s, beginning with the 1981 event. Brayton was killed in practice after qualifying for the pole position for the 1996 race.

Career
During the mid-1980s, Brayton helped introduce the Buick stock-block V-6 engine to Indianapolis. His father's firm, Brayton Engineering, was a major developer of the race engine. In 1985, he qualified 2nd and set the one-lap Indianapolis Motor Speedway track record in the process. He dropped out early and finished 30th when the engine expired. He would not finish the race again until 1989, when he scored his best finish at the Speedway, 6th place but seven laps down. He would equal this finishing position in 1993, driving a Lola-Cosworth for Dick Simon Racing.

When Buick pulled out of IndyCar racing in 1993, John Menard Jr. continued developing the engine, now badged as the Menard V-6. Brayton, now without a regular ride in the CART IndyCar series, joined the Indy-only Menards team in 1994. Turbocharger boost and pop-off valve problems relegated him to a 17th-place finish.

Brayton was prepared to make his NASCAR debut at the 1995 Brickyard 400. However, he crashed his car during a private test session, and suffered a broken ankle and a concussion.

In 1996, Indianapolis Motor Speedway owner Tony George established the Indy Racing League, and Team Menard signed up to compete in their first full season of IndyCar racing. Because the majority of the established teams and drivers of open-wheel racing competed in the rival CART series, Brayton (and rookie teammate Tony Stewart) were considered legitimate contenders for the IRL title. After a bad start to the season, Brayton asserted his competitiveness by winning his second Indy pole after a dramatic qualifying session in which he withdrew an already-qualified car to get a second chance at taking the top spot.

Death
Brayton's car scrubbed off virtually no speed as it spun, and as the car impacted the wall on its left side, the force was such that Brayton's head also impacted the wall. Brayton was killed instantly by the severe impact. His funeral, held in his hometown of Coldwater, Michigan, was attended by a large contingent of drivers and racing personalities.

Teammate Tony Stewart, who qualified second, took over the pole starting position. A substitute driver, Danny Ongais, took over the car with which Brayton had qualified for the pole, and finished seventh.

Personal life
Brayton began dating his future wife, Becky, in 1981 and an 11-year courtship followed. The couple have a daughter named Carly, who was 2 and a half years old at the time of Scott's death.

On Easter Sunday 1999, Becky married another IRL driver, Robbie Buhl, who would later become a partner in Dreyer & Reinbold Racing.

Memorial Street Circuit
A street course in Grand Rapids, Michigan, used for SCCA racing was known as the Scott Brayton Memorial Street Circuit. It was used for the West Michigan Grand Prix in 1998 and 1999, after which the event folded.

Scott Brayton Driver's Trophy
Following Brayton's death, the Indianapolis Motor Speedway announced a new trophy for the Indianapolis 500 dedicated to the driver who best exemplifies the attitude, spirit and competitive drive of Brayton. A driver could only be awarded the trophy once in his/her Indy career. It was awarded through 2009.

Racing record

American open-wheel racing results
(key) (Races in bold indicate pole position)

PPG Indycar Series
(key) (Races in bold indicate pole position)

Indy Racing League

Indianapolis 500

 For the 1996 Indianapolis 500, Brayton qualified on the pole.  The following Friday he was fatally injured driving a back-up car during practice. In the race Danny Ongais drove the pole car from the back of the field and finished seventh.

See also
List of Indianapolis Motor Speedway fatalities

References

External links
 
 

1959 births
1996 deaths
People from Coldwater, Michigan
Racing drivers from Michigan
Indianapolis 500 drivers
Indianapolis 500 polesitters
IndyCar Series drivers
Champ Car drivers
Racing drivers who died while racing
Sports deaths in Indiana
Filmed deaths in motorsport